Live Music Now is a charity working and campaigning to create inclusive, measurable social impact through music. 

Live Music Now works with special educational needs providers and care homes to provide live music participation to those living in challenging circumstances who rarely, if ever, have the opportunity to experience live music.

The name Live Music Now covers several connected charities around the world, the first of which was founded in the UK in 1977 by violinist Yehudi Menuhin and Sir Ian Stouzker. The organisation follows Yehudi Menuhin's belief that: 'Music, amongst all the great arts, is the language which penetrates most deeply into the human spirit...so that it might comfort, heal and bring delight." 

Live Music Now's current chairman, in position since 2018, is Sir Vernon Ellis.

United Kingdom

Live Music Now was founded in 1977 in the United Kingdom, by the violinist Yehudi Menuhin and Founder Chairman, Ian Stoutzker CBE. Live Music Now UK has reached 2.8 million people through over 80,000 workshops and interactive performances. In 1984, Live Music Now extended into Scotland, forming a sister organisation, Live Music Now Scotland. 

During the COVID-19 pandemic, Live Music Now put together an archive of online musical resources which could be accessed by families, teachers and care home staff to allow children and residents to watch pre-recorded and live-streamed performances remotely.

Musicians 
Live Music Now employs over 250 professional musicians, ranging from performers of Western classical and jazz to those playing traditional instruments such as the West African kora. Musicians are recruited, trained and mentored to provide them with the skills needed to lead in-person and digital sessions in various settings.

Children and young people 
Live Music Now works with schools and communities, connecting musicians with audiences for whom they can make a real difference. Examples of this work are Lullaby and Including Me. 

During Lullaby, musicians are paired with families to write a personalised lullaby for their baby. This project follows a model established by Carnegie Hall in New York, and is being developed with the NHS and other partners across the UK. The project’s aims are to improve peri-natal healthcare and reduce health inequalities caused by economic, cultural and education disadvantage. 

Including Me was developed to continue engaging young people with live music during the pandemic. The project paired a musician with a young person and their family for ten sessions in order to explore musical performance, instruments, song-writing and improvisation.

Adult social care 
Live Music Now works with care providers, care settings, and the people that live and work in them, bringing the enjoyment, excitement and benefits of live music back into peoples’ lives, through one-off participatory concerts, residencies and training. 

An example of a project in Adult Social Care is Songs & Scones. Aiming to combat feelings of loneliness and isolation in the UK, Songs & Scones are events for isolated members of local communities. During the events, attendees are provided with refreshments and a live musical performance and have the opportunity to socialise with other local residents and access local council services.

Live Music Now worldwide

Scotland
Germany
Netherlands
Austria
Switzerland
Denmark
France

References

External links 
Live Music Now official website
Yehudi Menuhin website
Yehudi Menuhin video talking about music's healing powers.

Non-profit organisations based in the United Kingdom